Mohamed Boudia (24 February 1932 – 28 June 1973) was an Algerian poet and  a senior member of the Popular Front for the Liberation of Palestine (PFLP). He was assassinated in Paris by a car bomb placed under his seat by Mossad agents as part of Operation Wrath of God. At the time of his assassination, Boudia was the Chief of PFLP operations in Europe. Boudia was replaced by Michel Moukharbal.

Boudia had been a participant in the Algerian War, during which he had been jailed for an attack on a petrol depot in southern France. The end of the war and Algerian independence in 1962 led to his release, having spent three years in prison. Boudia was a playwright, and after independence became director of Algeria's national theatre. He fled to France after Houari Boumediène seized power in June 1965. He ran a theatre in Paris, whilst beginning to work with figures such as Carlos the Jackal.

References

1932 births
1973 deaths
People from Algiers
Assassinated Algerian politicians
People of the Algerian War
Algerian people imprisoned abroad
Prisoners and detainees of France
Popular Front for the Liberation of Palestine members
People killed in Mossad operations
20th-century Algerian politicians
Deaths by car bomb in France
Algerian people murdered abroad
People murdered in France